Terry Oroszi is an American author. She is a Professor and Vice Chair at Wright State University.

Early life and education 
Oroszi graduated high school in Muscatine, Iowa and announced to her parents that she was putting college on hold, instead she was joining the Army. Her first duty station was in Ft. Lewis, WA followed by a tour in Wurzburg, Germany. In Germany she met and married her husband Andrew Oroszi.  When their commitment to the military was over, they moved to his hometown, Dayton, Ohio. Oroszi has two children.

Oroszi attended Wright State University for undergraduate degree in Biological Sciences. She then pursued MS in Biological Sciences from Wright State University. Oroszi earned her doctoral degree in education from Wright State University by completing a study and dissertation on high-stakes decision-making for crisis leadership under the guidance of Jill Lindsey. Oroszi was the first at Wright State University to receive an Ed.D., and the only one to complete this degree in under three years. ral fellowship was completed in the new Simulations Center at the Dayton Veterans Administration Medical Center under the leadership of the first African American thoracic surgeon, Rosalyn Scott.

Career 
Oroszi served in the US Army for four years active duty between 1984 and 1988, and inactive until 1992. Her United States military occupation code was in Air Defense Artillery and during her time in Germany she was part of the NBC (nuclear biological and chemical) team.

Oroszi began her career as a Graduate Teaching Assistant at the Department of Biological Sciences in Wright State University between 1998 and 2000. Between 2001 and 2007, Oroszi was employed as a research assistant, initially at the Department of Biological Sciences in Wright State University (2001-2013) and later a staff scientist in the pharmacology and toxicology department, Boonshoft School of Medicine, Wright State University. In 2008, Oroszi was made director of education in the department.

Between 2005 and 2006, Oroszi was employed as the assistant director of pharmacology and toxicology graduate program at Wright State University and in 2006 she was given the role of director of Pharmacology Genetic Testing Facility in Boonshoft School of Medicine at the University. Oroszi was appointed as the Director of Chemical, Biological, Radiological, Nuclear Defense (CBRN) Certificate Program at Wright State in 2012.

Since 2008, Oroszi has also been working as the director of the pharmacology and toxicology graduate programs. She has also been working as an assistant professor in healthcare and homeland security in Boonshoft School of Medicine since 2016. In 2020 Oroszi became a faculty senator, representing Boonshoft School of Medicine at Wright State University.

Oroszi has spoken on American terrorism, CBRN, power, and leadership, to fellow academics, members of the military, government, and industry. Notable speaking engagements in 2019 include the National Security Agency, Quantico, and US Congressional Staff in Washington, DC.,

Board positions
Oroszi serves on the National InfraGard Members Alliance Board as secretary. Prior to that she was the InfraGard Dayton chapter president (2020)
Oroszi serves as chairman and cofounder of The Dayton Think Tank. The Dayton Think Tank's focus is on crisis, threat, emergency and disaster management for S.W. Ohio.

Bibliography

Books
Terry Oroszi, 2008, Descendants of Johann and Margaretha Rupp and Their Families: 200 Years of Family History, Greylander Press, 978-0-9821683-0-1 
Larry James and Terry Oroszi, 2015, Weapons of Mass Psychological Destruction and the People Who Use Them, ABC-Clio, 978-1-4408-3755-5
Terry Oroszi, 2019, Operation Deep Dive: A Step Into the Past, Greylander Press, 978-0-9821683-7-0
Terry Oroszi, 2019, Mr. Smith Goes To North Korea, Greylander Press, 978-0-9821683-5-6
Terry Oroszi, 2019, Operation Stormfront: From Weatherman to Wall Street, Greylander Press, 978-0-9821683-6-3
 Terry Oroszi and David Ellis, 2019, The American Terrorist: Everything You Need to Know to be a Subject Matter Expert, Greylander Press, 978-0-9821683-3-2
Terry Oroszi, 2020, Operation Stormfront: From Weatherman to Wall Street THE GRAPHIC NOVEL, Greylander Press, 978-0-9821683-4-9

Chapters
Oroszi T.L., Shoenleben J., James L.C., 2018, "Increasing Healthy Exercise in the Primary Care Setting", Behavioral Medicine, and Integrated Care, Duckworth M., O'Donohue W.,Springer, Cham, 978-3-319-93003-9
Terry Oroszi, 2019, "Contextual Factors Influencing CBRN Leadership Decision-Making", Chemical Warfare Agents: Biomedical and Psychological Effects, Medical Countermeasures, and Emergency Response, Lukey, B. J., Romano Jr, J. A., & Salem, H., CRC Press,9781498769211
Terry Oroszi and David Ellis, 2020, "The Mindset of a Terrorist", Agroterrorism: National Defense Assessment, Strategies, and Capabilities, Norton, R. & Mauroni, A, Maxwell Air Force Base, Alabama, 978-0-9914849-5-9

References

External links 
 

Living people
American writers
Wright State University faculty
1966 births